Bieling Architekten is a German architecture firm located in Kassel, Hesse, with another office in Hamburg. Founded by Josef Bieling in 1955, the firm has projects throughout Germany. His son Thomas Bieling. a director since 2011, runs the company as a group of independent architects. Earlier names included Architekturbüro Josef Bieling, Bieling & Bieling Architekten, and Bieling & Bieling. They designed apartment buildings and offices, and became known for winning competitions for new quarters, such as Waidmarkt in Cologne and Wallhöfe in Hamburg.

History 

In 1955, the architect Josef Bieling (1919–1981) founded the Architekturbüro Josef Bieling in his hometown Kassel. He focused on the planning and building of churches in the dioceses of Fulda, Paderborn and Hildesheim. He built 35 new churches, among other sacred buildings, and restored and remodeled several others. He also engaged in the building of senior citizens’ homes, kindergartens, parish halls, hospitals, schools, hotels and private homes.

His sons, Kurt Bieling (born 1951) and Thomas Bieling (born 1956), also studied architecture, at the Technische Universität Braunschweig. From 2011, Thomas Bieling has been the only director of the firm now called Bieling Architekten.

Competitions 
The office took part in several competitions for architecture and realization, and has received more than 100 awards at competitions, including:
 2006: Quartiersentwicklung Neustadt / Wallhöfe in Hamburg
 2007: Wohn- und Gewerbequartier Waidmarkt in Cologne
 2008: Geschäftshaus Große Packhofstraße in Hanover
 2009: Geschäftshaus an der Fürstenrieder Straße in Munich
 2009:  in Paderborn
 2010: Hybrid Houses, model project of the exhibition

Awards 
Bieling Architkten has received several awards:
 1994: : 
 2001: Deutscher Fassadenpreis ... (recognition): new building Ambulantes Herzzentrum Kassel
 2002: : Crematory in Kassel
 2002: Vorbildliche Bauten in Hessen: Home for several families (Mehrfamilienhaus) Barth in Kassel
 2003: Prize of the Association of German Architects in Hesse (BDA Prize, Simon-Louis-du-Ry-Plakette: Entrance hall of the hospital Städtische Kliniken in Kassel, and an office building
 2003: BDA Prize: offices and  stores (Büro- und Geschäftshaus) at the Friedrichsplatz in Kassel

References

External links 

 
 Bieling Architekten baunetz-architekten.de
 Bieling Architekten german-architects.com
 max40 – Junge Architekten Bund Deutscher Architekten / Hessen
 Waidmarkt fiabciprixgermany.com

20th-century German architects
21st-century German architects
German companies established in 1955